Đỗ Hùng Dũng (born 8 September 1993) is a Vietnamese professional footballer who plays as a midfielder for V.League 1 club Hà Nội and captains the Vietnam national team.

International career

International goals

Vietnam U23

Vietnam

Honours
Sài Gòn
V.League 2: 2015 
Hà Nội
V.League 1: 2016, 2018, 2019, 2022; runner-up: 2020
Vietnamese National Cup: 2019, 2020, 2022; Runner-up: 2016
Vietnamese Super Cup: 2019, 2020, 2021; Runner-up: 2016, 2017 
Vietnam U23/Olympic
Southeast Asian Games (2): 2019, 2021
Asian Games fourth place: 2018
VFF Cup: 2018
Vietnam 
AFF Championship: 2018; runner-up: 2022
VFF Cup: 2022
King's Cup runner-up: 2019

Individual
Vietnamese Golden Ball: 2019

References

External links

1993 births
Living people
Vietnamese footballers
Association football midfielders
V.League 1 players
Hanoi FC players
Sportspeople from Hanoi
Footballers at the 2018 Asian Games
2019 AFC Asian Cup players
Asian Games competitors for Vietnam
Competitors at the 2019 Southeast Asian Games
Southeast Asian Games medalists in football
Southeast Asian Games gold medalists for Vietnam
Vietnam international footballers
Competitors at the 2021 Southeast Asian Games